Plectropomus, commonly known as the coral groupers, is a genus of marine ray-finned fish, groupers from the subfamily Epinephelinae, part of the family Serranidae, which also includes the anthias and sea basses. They are found in the Indo-Pacific region.

Habitat and biology
The Plectropomus coral groupers are ecologically similar to the species in the genera Cephalolophis and Mycteroperca, the latter being regarded as the Atlantic and eastern Pacific equivalents of the coral groupers. They are large groupers, with some species attaining total lengths of at least , They prefer shallow tropical and subtropical waters where there are coral reefs and are less sedentary than the groupers in the genera Epinephelus and Cephalopholis. They are predatory species, preying largely on fish.

Distribution
Plectropomus coral groupers are confined to the Indo-Pacific region where they are found from the Red Sea and the east coast of Africa as far south as South Africa and east into the Western Pacific Ocean as far as Polynesia, north to Japan and south to Australia.

Utlisation
Plectropomus coral groupers are very important to artisanal fisheries wherever they are found and they are caught using hook and line by spear fishing and trapping, however they are a frequent cause of Ciguatera poisoning among consumers of their flesh.

Species
The following eight species are classified within the genus Plectropomus:

Species

Other authorities recognise Plectropomus marisrubri, which Fishbase treats as a synonym of P. pessuliferus, as a valid species., while others as treat it as a subspecies of P. pessuliferus, P.p. maristrubri.

References 

 
Epinephelini
Taxonomy articles created by Polbot
Ray-finned fish genera